Alabama is an American country, and bluegrass band that has recorded nineteen studio albums, including sixteen for RCA Nashville, as well as two Christmas albums and two Christian music albums. Formed in Fort Payne, Alabama in 1969, the band was founded by Randy Owen (lead vocals, rhythm guitar) and his cousin Teddy Gentry (bass guitar, background vocals), soon joined by their other cousin, Jeff Cook (lead guitar, fiddle, keyboards). Alabama's biggest success came in the 1980s, where the band had over 27 number one hits, seven multi-platinum albums and received numerous awards. Alabama's first single on RCA Nashville, "Tennessee River", began a streak of number one singles, including "Love in the First Degree" (1981), "Mountain Music" (1982), "Dixieland Delight" (1983), "If You're Gonna Play in Texas (You Gotta Have a Fiddle in the Band)" (1984) and "Song of the South" (1988).

Alabama's main members — Randy Owen, Teddy Gentry, and Jeff Cook — wrote or co-wrote a significant amount of material in their catalogue, which was considered unusual for country musicians at that time. Contributing songwriter Greg Fowler is credited on 72 Alabama songs, followed by Ronnie Rogers at 68. The group has recorded 260 songs (65 of which are singles), which include original compositions, cover songs, collaborations with artists such as Lionel Richie and Brad Paisley.

Songs

See also
Alabama discography

Notes

References

Sources

External links
The Alabama Band

Alabama